Oath: Chronicles of Empire and Exile is a 2021 board game with asymmetric gameplay and legacy elements designed by Cole Wehrle, illustrated by Kyle Ferrin, and published by Leder Games. In Oath, players compete to become the Chancellor, and the events of each game influence the events of the games that follow. Upon its release, Oath received positive reviews, and an expansion for the game is in development. The game is part of an increase in the release of games that are based on a scenario or have a campaign structure, and is focused on fantasy politics and crisis.

Gameplay 
In Oath, 1-6 players compete in an asymmetric game, taking upon the role of individuals who are trying to rule a fantasy land. One Chancellor player begins with significant control over eight Sites which are divided between three regions: the Cradle, the Provinces and the Hinterland. The other players start with an Exile character that can eventually become a Citizen. Everyone has the same major actions; they may search the deck, muster troops, trade favor and secrets (the two main currencies in the game), recover relics, campaign militarily against enemies, and travel across the board. Through the use of Denizen cards that can be picked up throughout the game, players are given access to unique powers. For games with only one or two players, the game includes an automated version of the Chancellor, the Clockwork Prince.

Victory can be earned in several ways. The Chancellor, if they continue to fulfil their Oathkeeper goal throughout the game, may roll a dice three times from turn five until turn eight, increasing their chances to win each turn. Vision cards can be picked up by Exiles which also enable victory goals, and an Exile may also attempt to usurp the Chancellor by completing the game's main goal. If the Chancellor wins but a Citizen has fulfilled certain conditions, the Citizen may win instead. Often, the game will end with a losing player forced to be a kingmaker for the other players, often decided through informal deal making and metagaming.

Development 
Wehrle sought in the production of Oath to place narrative value as a priority, and to remove any predetermined scenarios so that every element of the game could be altered. His experience of second hand board games during childhood, such as Squad Leader and other Avalon Hill board games as well as HeroQuest and Chancellorsville, led him to want to design a board game that had a "more resonant echo"; he wanted each box to have a tangible history without the player destroying parts of it, as was the norm in many legacy games. Other inspirations for Wehrle in terms of Oath included Imperium, Barbarian, Kingdom and Empire, and Blood Royale, a role-playing game.

Kickstarter 
A Kickstarter campaign for the game was launched in January 2020 to fund its production, with a single pledge level of $90. Backers who pledged this amount received a journal to chronicle their sessions as well as metal favor coins and resin secret tokens, which were sold separately to the public upon the game's full release. It met its funding goal of $50,000 quickly.

Reception 
Oath received generally positive reviews. Dicebreaker wrote of its "small, thoughtful details" and "evocative world and deep strategy". Tabletop Gaming compared Ferrin's artwork for the game to The Dark Crystal, calling it "evocative and characterful." Polygon described the game as "an elaborate role-playing game wearing the clothes of a complex strategy title", and later praised the game for its neoprene game board. In 2021, Gamereactor complimented its production and design, but also wrote of the game's steep learning curve and niche target audience. IGN listed the game as one of the best strategy board games in 2022.

Awards 

 2021 Golden Geek Award for 'Most Innovative Board Game'
 2021 Tabletop Gaming Award for 'Best Board Game of 2021'
 2021 Dice Tower 'Best Game from a Small Publisher' nominee
 2022 SXSW Gaming Awards' 'Tabletop Game of the Year' nominee
 2022 American Tabletop Awards' 'Complex Games' award nominee.

See also 
 Root, a previous board game designed by Cole Wehrle
 Pax Pamir, another board game designed by Cole Wehrle

References

External links 
 Oath page on the Leder Games website
 

American board games
Asymmetric board games
Board games introduced in 2021
Fantasy board games
Kickstarter-funded tabletop games
Legacy games